The basketball tournaments of National Collegiate Athletic Association (Philippines) 77th season hosted by the Philippine Christian University began on July 7, 2001, at the Araneta Coliseum with Manila mayor Lito Atienza as the special guest and speaker, followed by the opening ceremonies and a quadruple-header. Games then are subsequently held at Rizal Memorial Coliseum. The opening rites and the games were aired live by the Media Conglomerates Inc. over PTV/NBN through the facilities of Silverstar Communications, Inc.

Seniors' tournament

Elimination round

Team standing

Match-up results

Scores
Results on top and to the right of the dashes are for first-round games; those to the bottom and to the left of it are second-round games.

Bracket

Semifinals 
San Sebastian and JRU have the twice-to-beat advantage. They only have to win once, while their opponents, twice, to progress.

JRU vs. CSB 

In Game 1, the defending champions Blazers relied on its star, Sunday Salvacion, who capped 39 points in the game including six treys. The game was a nip-and-tuck affair until midway in the first half, when Salvacion broke a 14-all deadlock. The Bombers never recovered and faced a 15-point deficit entering the final two minutes.

The Heavy Bombers relied on its veterans to mount a huge lead, 58–32 in the third quarter and never looked back. Defending champion Blazers, however, conspired a comeback by making ten triples, but it wasn't enough to push themselves on the way to Finals. Graduating players Ernani Epondulan finished with 35 points and Ariel Capus made 17 of his own.

San Sebastian vs. Mapúa 

{{Basketballbox|date=September 22 |time=1:30 p.m. |place=Rizal Memorial Coliseum, Manila |TV=PTV-4
|teamA= |scoreA=48|teamB= |scoreB=44
|series=San Sebastian wins series in two games
|Q1=16-11|Q2=10-10|Q3=8-14|Q4=14-9|points1=Paul Reguerra 10|points2=Jeff Martin 12}}The Cardinals, led by rookie point guard Jeffrey Martin, Steve Marucot, and Roberto Lagar found their rhythm in the final period of Game 1 to force the Stags to a rubber match. Lagar hit back-to-back treys midway in the final period to give his team the lead, 57–49. However, the Stags recovered and reduced the deficit, 59–58, thanks to Michael Gonzales' pair of charities in the last 21 seconds. The Stags went to fouls to stop the clock when Lagar missed his last free throw but Marucot's putback sealed the victory for the Cardinals.

The Stags, who are enjoying a twice-to-beat advantage, relied on endgame breaks in Game 2 to eliminate Mapúa and advance to the Finals.

 Finals 
The San Sebastian Stags are back again in the Finals after their disappointing defeat from CSB Blazers last season. They last held their five-straight championships from 1993 to 1997 and then the streak ended in 1998 at the hands of Letran Knights.

Meanwhile, the JRU Heavy Bombers has not seen a title since 1972. They came close to winning the title in 1999, only to falter to the Letran Knights. The disappointment continued last year when they were beaten twice by the San Sebastian Stags in the semifinals.Finals Most Valuable Player: 

The two teams clashed neck-to-neck all throughout Game 1 but the Stags are the better team in crunch time. The Heavy Bombers entered the final quarter with the lead when the Stags applied its pressure defense. Stags' Roy Falcasantos converted a layup in the last 48 seconds of the game to break a 74-all tieup then later converted a charity to give his team the win.

JRU relied on the offense of season MVP Nani Epondulan, Joel Finuliar, Rendel Dela Rea, and Ariel Capus to register a 68–54 lead in the final quarter of Game 2 to keep the Stags at bay and then finally made a comeback to the series.

Showing experience, the Stags never faltered from the start of Game 3, as they outclassed the Heavy Bombers by 33 points en route to their 10th NCAA championship. Nani Epondulan, the season MVP, tallied 13 points in the first half, but was made scoreless in the second half.

 Awards 
 Most Valuable Player: 
 Mythical Five: 
 
 
 
 
 Rookie of the Year:  
 Coach of the Year: 

 Juniors' tournament 

 Bracket 
*Game went into overtime

FinalsFinals Most Valuable Player: 

 Awards 
 Most Valuable Player: 
 Rookie of the Year: 
 Mythical Five: 
 
 
 
 
 Defensive Player of the Year: 
 Most Improved Player: 
 Coach of the Year:'''

References 

76
2001 in Philippine basketball